The Griffies-Williams Baronetcy, of Llwyny Wormwood in the County of Carmarthen, was a title in the Baronetage of the United Kingdom. It was created on 22 May 1815 for George Griffies-Williams. Born George Griffies, he assumed by Royal sign manual the additional surname of Williams in 1785. The title became extinct on the death of the third Baronet in 1877.

The family seat was Llwynywermod, near Myddfai, Llandovery, Carmarthenshire.

Griffies-Williams baronets, of Llwyny Wormwood (1815)
Sir George Griffies-Williams, 1st Baronet (–1843)
Sir Erasmus Henry Griffies-Williams, 2nd Baronet (1794–1870)
Sir Watkin Lewes Griffies-Williams, 3rd Baronet (c. 1800–1877)

References

Extinct baronetcies in the Baronetage of the United Kingdom